Shayna Fox is an American former actress, known for voicing Regina "Reggie" Rocket on the Nickelodeon animated television series Rocket Power as well as Savannah on All Grown Up!.

Early life 
Fox is the second of two daughters born in Los Angeles, California to Jewish American parents Herschel Fox and Judy Spitzer.

Career 
Fox began her acting career in 1995, she made her feature film debut as the voice of Amy the Mountain Gorilla in the science fiction film Congo. Her other film credits include Can't Be Heaven as Shirley and co-written, co-produced and co-directed the short film The 10 Minute Run were she also played as the Girl.

Fox also co-starred in Disney's That's So Raven as Tracie and had a supporting role in The Amanda Show.

She also worked as a voice actress in various animated television series and video games, she became the voice of Bela in The Oz Kids which ran for only 26 episodes. In 1999, she was cast as the voice of Regina "Reggie" Rocket in Nickelodeon's animated television series Rocket Power, which ran for five years until 2004, she has reprised the role in the television films Rocket Power: Race Across New Zealand, Rocket Power: Island of the Menehune and in the video games Nicktoons Nick Tunes, Rocket Power: Team Rocket Rescue, Rocket Power: Beach Bandits and Nickelodeon Party Blast. Her other voice credits include Savannah Shane in All Grown Up! and Angelica and Susie's Pre-School Daze.

Filmography

Film

Television

Video games

References

External links 

American child actresses
Jewish American actresses
Living people
Actresses from Los Angeles
American voice actresses
Year of birth missing (living people)
21st-century American Jews
21st-century American women